The Irish national Australian rules football team represent Ireland in Australian rules football and is selected from the best Irish born and raised players primarily from the clubs of the Australian Rules Football League of Ireland but also playing abroad. 

The men's team formed in 2001, going through the Atlantic Alliance Cup undefeated in 2001 to become European champions before also taking the 2002 AFL International Cup where it has made the finals ever since including a 2011 championship. In the early 2010s it was a European powerhouse, winning back-to-back AFL Europe championships in 2010 and 2013 and Euro Cup championships in 2011 and 2012. In 2022 it was once again crowned AFL Europe champions. It has formed intense international rivalries with Papua New Guinea and New Zealand and European rivalries with Great Britain and Denmark and remains in the top five nations in the sport. 

The women's team formed in 2011 for its International Cup debut and is equally successful, being crowned European champions in 2019 and 2022 (the most of any women's side) in addition to a record 5 Euro Cup championships. It has made the final in every International Cup with 2 International Cup forming a strong rivalry with Canada.

Ireland's form has been largely unpredictable due to the availability of experienced players in the playing pool from Gaelic games, particularly Gaelic football (due to its strong similarities).

Identity
The team was first nicknamed  "Fianna na hÉireann" (Irish for "Fianna of Ireland") after a band of heroic warriors in Irish mythology.  In 2005, it was renamed the "Green Machine" however in 2014 it reverted to "Ireland Warriors" and has retained this nickname since.

The team wears a green (one of the national colours of Ireland) guernsey with a Celtic strip featuring the Irish harp symbol. For the 2022 AFL European Championships, both men's and women's teams adopted a darker green, ditching the harp for a more traditional Australian rules guernsey consisting of a white and orange chevron across the chest.

History

The Irish team won the Atlantic Alliance Cup in 2001 to become the Northern Hemisphere champions.

In the following year, the team participated in the inaugural Australian Football International Cup and finished first, leaving the competition as international champions.  The team benefited from the availability of several Gaelic football players.

In 2005, Ireland finished fourth.  An increasingly competitive New Zealand, Papua New Guinea and the United States of America finished ahead of Ireland and the team suffered from injury and the Gaelic Athletic Association discouraging the use of Gaelic players.

The Green Machine's best and fairest player (from the 2005 International Cup) is Mike Finn.

Recently the national team played a curtain raiser at the West Coast Eagles vs Fremantle exhibition match at the Oval in London where they beat the British Bulldogs.

The Warriors finished fourth again at the 2008 Australian Football International Cup and the best and fairest player was once again Mike Finn. Three Irish players were selected in the All-International team.

The Warriors won the inaugural European Championships in 2010 defeating Denmark in the final 11.2(68) to 8.3(51). Warriors captain Cian Quigley was named Best on Ground in the final. Three Irish players were named on the Team of the Tournament.

In 2011 the Warriors won the fourth International Cup beating PNG 8.5 (53) to 5.5 (35).  Mike Finn was named Best on Ground in the final. Three Irish players were selected in the All-International team.

The Warriors returned to the International Cup in 2014 fielding a strong team.

Test results

International honours
 2010 European Championships in Australian Football Champions

Irish players selected for All-International Team

See also
Australian rules football in Ireland
ARFLI

References

External links
Official website of the Irish Warriors national team

Australian rules football in Ireland
National Australian rules football teams
Australian rules football